Arthur William FitzRoy Somerset (20 September 1855 – 8 January 1937) was an English first-class cricketer. Though hailing from Chatham, Kent, Somerset moved to Castle Goring, a country house now in the town of Worthing in Sussex, and former home of Sir Bysshe Shelley, grandfather of the poet Percy Bysshe Shelley.

Somerset played 48 games for Sussex and London County between 1891 and 1906. As a right-handed batsman and occasional right-arm fast bowler, he scored 1,221 runs at a batting average of 20.01 and took two wickets at 26.50 runs per wicket. He also captained Worthing Cricket Club. He died at Castle Goring aged 81.

Family 

Somerset is the great grandson of Henry Somerset, 5th Duke of Beaufort and the son of Colonel FitzRoy Molyneux Henry Somerset and Jemima Drummond Nairne. He married his 2nd cousin Gwendolin Adelaide Katherine Georgiana Matilda Somerset, daughter of Sir Alfred Plantagenet Frederick Charles Somerset and Adelaide Harriet Brooke-Pechell, on 25 July 1887. He held the offices of Deputy Lieutenant of Sussex and Justice of the Peace.
The children of Arthur William FitzRoy Somerset and Gwendolin Adelaide Katherine Georgiana Matilda Somerset are:
Adelaide Millicent Blanche Gwendolen Somerset, b. 13 Oct 1888, d. 20 Jan 1958
Arthur Plantagenet Francis Cecil Somerset, b. 28 Sep 1889, d. 13 Oct 1957
Lieutenant FitzRoy Aubrey Somerset, b. 21 Dec 1892, d. 7 Jul 1916

References

 http://thepeerage.com/p11974.htm#i119731
 

1855 births
1937 deaths
Sportspeople from Chatham, Kent
Sussex cricketers
London County cricketers
Marylebone Cricket Club cricketers
People educated at Wellington College, Berkshire
English cricketers